Demos Parneros (born March 10, 1962) is an American businessman who was previously the chief executive officer of Barnes & Noble and president of North American retail and online at Staples Inc.

Early life 
Born in Cyprus, Parneros moved to New York City when he was nine years old. He graduated from New York University with a Bachelor of Science degree in management.

Career 
Parneros began his career at Macy's Inc. and then held multiple management positions at Staples before joining Barnes and Noble in November 2016.

Staples 
Parneros joined Staples in 1987 as general manager of its first store in New York City and worked in the company's human resources, marketing, merchandising and store operations divisions. In 2002, Parneros was appointed president of the company's U.S. Superstores and responsibility for over 1,000 locations. In 2012, Parneros was appointed president of Staples North American Stores’ 1,800 locations and the company's online business, Staples.com. Under Parneros, Staples launched its first omnichannel stores, customer kiosks that merged the company's retail and online product offerings.

KeyBank 
Parneros served on the board of KeyBank from 2014 to 2018.

Barnes & Noble 
Parneros was appointed chief operating officer of Barnes & Noble in November 2016. In April 2017, he was appointed CEO, with responsibility for all company operations, including brick-and-mortar stores, merchandising, e-Commerce, publishing, IT systems and real estate. At the time, Barnes and Noble was searching for effective ways to compete with Amazon and strengthen its retail and digital Nook businesses. While the brick-and-mortar bookstore market stabilized, the company continued to experience sales and revenue declines. As part of Parneros’ turnaround strategy, Barnes & Noble designed and opened smaller store locations and refocused on book sales. In 2019, the company opened its first five prototype stores, half the size of the traditional stores, to align with its omnichannel sales approach. Parneros was terminated in July 2018 for alleged violation of company policies. The company policy that he violated was sexually harassing employees. Parneros subsequently sued Barnes & Noble for breach of contract and defamation. In October 2020, Barnes & Noble and Parneros agreed to amicably settle the case with all claims dropped.

Personal life 
Parneros lives with his wife, Debbie, in Boston, Massachusetts. They have two children.

References

1962 births
American chief executives
New York University alumni
Living people